Aleksander Zawadzki (1899–1964) was a Polish Communist Party leader and head of state.

Aleksander Zawadzki may also refer to:

Aleksander Zawadzki (naturalist) (1798–1868), Polish naturalist
Aleksander Zawadzki (activist) (1859–1926), Polish political and educational activist

See also
Zawadzki (surname)